Sandborn is a town in Vigo Township, Knox County, Indiana, United States. The population was 359 at the 2020 census.  It is the home of the annual Black Creek Festival.

History
Sandborn was laid out in 1868. It was named for a railroad official. The Sandborn post office was established in 1869.

Geography
Sandborn is located at  (38.896191, -87.185150). The town lies in northeastern Knox County, just south of the Knox-Greene county line.  Indiana State Road 59 traverses Sandborn, connecting the town with Linton and the Greene-Sullivan State Forest to the north.  State Road 67 passes through the northwestern limits of Sandborn, connecting the town with the Vincennes area to the southwest.

Demographics

2010 census
As of the census of 2010, there were 415 people, 174 households, and 114 families living in the town. The racial makeup of the town was 98.6% White, 0.2% African American, 1.0% Native American, and 0.2% from other races. Hispanic or Latino of any race were 0.7% of the population.

There were 174 households, of which 29.9% had children under the age of 18 living with them, 55.7% were married couples living together, 8.0% had a female householder with no husband present, 1.7% had a male householder with no wife present, and 34.5% were non-families. 28.7% of all households were made up of individuals, and 12.6% had someone living alone who was 65 years of age or older. The average household size was 2.39 and the average family size was 2.98.

The median age in the town was 42.1 years. 22.7% of residents were under the age of 18; 7.8% were between the ages of 18 and 24; 23.9% were from 25 to 44; 28.8% were from 45 to 64; and 16.9% were 65 years of age or older. The gender makeup of the town was 48.0% male and 52.0% female.

2000 census
As of the census of 2000, there were 451 people, 193 households, and 132 families living in the town. The racial makeup of the town was 97.34% White, 0.44% African American, 1.11% Native American, and 1.11% from two or more races. Hispanic or Latino of any race were 0.44% of the population.

There were 193 households, out of which 29.0% had children under the age of 18 living with them, 62.2% were married couples living together, 5.7% had a female householder with no husband present, and 31.1% were non-families. 29.0% of all households were made up of individuals, and 16.1% had someone living alone who was 65 years of age or older. The average household size was 2.34 and the average family size was 2.88.

In the town, the population was spread out, with 23.1% under the age of 18, 6.0% from 18 to 24, 25.9% from 25 to 44, 26.2% from 45 to 64, and 18.8% who were 65 years of age or older. The median age was 41 years. For every 100 females, there were 93.6 males. For every 100 females age 18 and over, there were 87.6 males.

The median income for a household in the town was $31,000, and the median income for a family was $47,031. Males had a median income of $38,594 versus $25,417 for females. The per capita income for the town was $17,878. About 7.9% of families and 11.5% of the population were below the poverty line, including 11.2% of those under age 18 and 6.1% of those age 65 or over.

Education
Sandborn has a public library, a branch of the Bicknell-Vigo Township Public Library.

Notable people
John R. Gregg - 2012 and 2016 Democratic nominee for Governor of Indiana; former Speaker of the Indiana House of Representatives
Grover Lowdermilk - Major League baseball pitcher (1909-1920) for the St. Louis Cardinals, Chicago Cubs, St. Louis Browns, Chicago White Sox, Cleveland Indians and the Detroit Tigers.
Lou Lowdermilk - Major League baseball pitcher (1911-1912) for the St. Louis Cardinals.

References

External links

Towns in Knox County, Indiana